Waleys is a surname. Notable people with the surname include:

 Robert Waleys, English Member of Parliament
 Thomas Waleys, 14th century English Dominican theologian
 William Waleys, English Member of Parliament in the 1380s and 1390

See also
 Henry le Walleis (died 1302), also spelled le Waleys, English businessman and politician, five-term mayor of London and mayor of Bordeaux